Assistance is an act of helping behavior.

Assistance may also refer to:

Types of help 
 Aid, in international relations, a voluntary transfer of resources from one country to another
 Assistance dog, a dog trained to aid or assist a person with a disability
 Consular assistance, help and advice provided by the diplomatic agents of a country to citizens of that country who are living or traveling overseas
 Development assistance,  financial aid given to support the development of developing countries
 Directory assistance, a phone service used to find out a specific telephone number and/or address
 Financial assistance (disambiguation), multiple forms
 General Assistance, in the United States, welfare programs that benefit adults without dependents
 Humanitarian assistance,  material or logistical assistance provided for humanitarian purposes
 Judicial assistance, admittance and enforcement of a judicial order by a court from one jurisdiction to a court in another jurisdiction
 Operation Assistance, military support to the civil authorities during the flooding of the Red River in April and May 1997
 Operator assistance, a service to assist the calling party placing a telephone call
 Roadside assistance, a service that provides assistance to motorists, or bicyclists, whose vehicles have suffered a mechanical failure
 Social assistance, welfare
 Travel assistance, a service which provides help, primarily in medical emergencies during travel
 User assistance, guided assistance to a user of a software product
 Virtual assistance, a service by independent entrepreneurs who work remotely and use technology to deliver services to clients globally
 Wind assistance, a term in track and field, which refers to the wind level during a race or event
 Windows Remote Assistance, a feature of Windows XP and later that allows a user to temporarily view or control a remote Windows computer
 Writ of assistance, a written order issued by a court instructing a law enforcement official to perform a certain task

Groups and organizations 
 American Student Assistance, a non-profit organization whose mission is to help students successfully complete the financing and repayment of higher education
 Civil Assistance, 1970s British civil defence group
 Polish Assistance, also known as "Bratnia Pomoc", is a charitable foundation based in New York City

Other uses 
 Assistance (play), a 2008 play written by Leslye Headland
 Assistance Bay, a small bay forming the head of Possession Bay
 HMS Assistance, a ship

See also 
 Aide (disambiguation)
 Assist (disambiguation)
 Assistant (disambiguation)
 Help (disambiguation)
 
 

Assistance